Karma Yoga is a book of lectures by Swami Vivekananda, as transcribed by Joseph Josiah Goodwin. It was published in February 1896 in New York City. Swami Vivekananda delivered a number of lectures in his rented rooms at 228 W 39th Street in New York City from December 1895 to January 1896. In 1895, friends and supporters of Swami Vivekananda hired Goodwin, a professional stenographer, who transcribed some of the lectures which were later published as this book. Goodwin later became a follower of Vivekananda.

Theme
The main topic of the book was Karma (work) and Karma Yoga. Swami Vivekananda discussed the concept of Karma in the Bhagavada Gita. Swami Vivekananda described Karma Yoga as a mental discipline that allows a person to carry out his/her duties as a service to the entire world, as a path to enlightenment.

Chapters

Karma in its Effect on Character
Each is great in his own place
The Secret of Work
What is Duty?
We help ourselves, not the world
Non-attachment is complete self-abnegation
Freedom is good and it should be continued
The Ideal of Karma-Yoga 3576464646

References

External links
Karma Yoga full text in Archive.org

1896 non-fiction books
Works by Swami Vivekananda
Classic yoga books
Books of lectures